was head of the Japanese Tachibana clan and onna-musha during the Sengoku period. She was a daughter of Tachibana Dōsetsu, a powerful retainer of the Ōtomo clan (which were rivals of the Shimazu clan at the time). Because Dosetsu had no sons, he requested that Ginchiyo be made family head.

Biography 
Tachibana Ginchiyo was the daughter of Tachibana Dōsetsu, a powerful samurai known as "Lightning God". Her mother was the daughter of Monchūsho Akitoyo(問注所鑑豊). Her mother and her former husband Yasutake Shigenori(安武鎮則) had a son Yasutake Moan(安武茂庵) and a daughter who married Netami Shigehisa(米谷比鎮久). According to one source, the chronicle of Komono clan, Dōsetsu had another daughter, Masachiyo(政千代) who died at 12 years old. The letter "誾" in Ginchiyo's name was named by Masugin, a monk in Hizen province. Ginchiyo was personally named by her father, with the name more or less meaning  "one who would not listen idly to others". There are many speculations about Ginchiyo's personality, but according to some reports from Otomo Family Document (大 友 家 文書 録), it is said that she was a severe and rigid figure, a valiant woman, with remarkable communication skills, as strong and determined as any famous warrior of the time. 

When Dōsetsu was ill and lost his other children, he was pleased that Ginchiyo had survived. Despite their suggestion to pass his leadership on to one of his distant relatives, he told his retainers that Ginchiyo would be his heiress after his death. 

Ginchiyo succeeded her father and led the clan in a period of difficulty at only 6 years old. She inherited her father's interests such as the status of castellan, territory, belongings and the famous sword Raikiri (雷切, Lightning Cutter). She recruited women to become her elite guard and trained all the maidens of the castle in warfare skills to intimidate visitors and to protect it if other clans attacked her domain. Dōsetsu died fighting the Shimazu clan at Neko'o castle on November 2, 1585. His wishes were respected and Ginchiyo became the lord of the Tachibana clan. Five years after her rule, she married Tachibana Muneshige, who had been adopted into the family and continued Dōsetsu's family line after Ginchiyo.

Kyushu Campaign 

In 1586 the Shimazu clan marched with his troops to conquer Kyushu, attacked the Ōtomo clan in the Bungo province and the Tachibana Castle in the north. The Tachibana clan fought back against Shimazu. In Otomo Family Document (大友家文書録), describes that when the commanders of the Shimazu army arrived near Tachibana castle, Ginchiyo armed the women with firearms and defended the castle gates. 

When Toyotomi Hideyoshi led 200,000 men to conquer Kyushu, the Shimazu army retreated to the Higo Province. The Tachibana forces were eventually forced to flee during the Kyūshū Campaign. Tachibana castle fell to Hideyoshi, who entrusted it to Kobayakawa Takakage. Ginchiyo and Muneshige allied with Hideyoshi in the campaign against their traditional rival, Shimazu clan.

Service under Hideyoshi 
After the Tachibana clan siding with Toyotomi Hideyoshi and he had conquered Kyushu in 1587, Muneshige split from the Ōtomo to become a daimyō in his own right. He was given Yanagawa castle in Chikugo province, after this the Tachibana became an independent clan. It is said that Ginchiyo and Muneshige did not like each other, she opposed the change of domain and many other policies of Muneshige. Even after transferring clan leadership to Muneshige, she still had much political and military influence. 

After Kyushu campaign, Hideyoshi is said to return Tachibana Castle to Ginchiyo and she lives separately from Muneshige, who stayed at Yanagawa Castle. When Muneshige was absent, Ginchiyo was responsible for managing the Tachibana clan domains and commanding Yanagawa Castle. The Tachibana clan fought in the Siege of Odawara the battle that unified Japan under Hideyoshi name.

In 1592 Hideyoshi ordered that Tachibana Muneshige and Tachibana Naotsugu participate of the Invasion to the Korea under the command of Kobayakawa Takakage. Hideyoshi built Nagoya castle as a base to launch attacks on Korea. The castle was relatively close to Ginchiyo's residence in Hizen Province, it is said that Hideyoshi invited Ginchiyo to visit the castle several times when her husband was away. However, when Hideyoshi saw Ginchiyo with her armed women, he left fearing her personality.

After the failure of Hideyoshi's campaign of Korea, Ginchiyo, who never gave birth to a child, divorces Muneshige and becomes a Buddhist nun.

Sekigahara Campaign 

After the death of Toyotomi Hideyoshi, the power of the Toyotomi clan declined and Japan would go to war again. In 1600 in the Battle of Sekigahara, the Tachibana clan would ally itself with Ishida Mitsunari in the Western army against the Eastern Army of Tokugawa Ieyasu. Ginchiyo first opposed Muneshige's decision to join the Western army.

At the Battle of Sekigahara, Muneshige participated in the attack against Kyōgoku Takatsugu who was holed-up in Ōtsu Castle in Ōmi Province.  The offensive included a total of 15,000 soldiers led by Mōri Motoyasu, Mōri Hidekane, and Tsukushi Hirokado.  Muneshige did not, however, join the main Battle of Sekigahara as Takatsugu surrendered on the same day.  After learning of the defeat of the Western Army, he advised the commander-in-chief, Mōri Terumoto, to hole-up in Ōsaka Castle, but this was rejected and he returned by sea route to Kyūshū.  Early in the tenth month, he entered Yanagawa Castle.  Letters of commendation dated 10/10 were given to retainers for their contributions in the Battle of Ōtsu Castle.  Ginchiyo led a group of family samurai and servants to meet him.

In the Kyushu Sekigahara campaign, Ginchiyo defended the Ōtomo clan from the invasion of Kuroda Kanbei and Katō Kiyomasa. After the defeat of Western Army in Sekigahara, the Eastern Army under the leadership of Kanbei, Kiyomasa and Nabeshima Katsushige began to march toward their doorstep, Ginchiyo organized her fellow nuns in armed resistance against the advancing army. She faced them alone while wearing armor at the Siege of Yanagawa and protected the rearguard of Muneshige to escape.

Kuroda and Kato were old comrades-in-arms of Tachibana Muneshige from the days of the Korean invasion, and following the unexpected and challenging resistance of Ginchiyo, they proposed that she and her ex-husband should surrender and join them in a campaign against Shimazu Yoshihiro, who was also from the Western Army and fled from Sekigahara. Muneshige agreed, but Tokugawa Ieyasu ordered the campaign to stop almost before it had begun because he did not want a further war in Kyushu. Ginchiyo and Muneshige was pardoned nonetheless. The Tachibana family was deprived of their domains in the aftermath of Mitsunari's defeat. Muneshige thanked Ginchiyo for helping him in battle and they both went their own way.

Later life 
After the battle, she was put under protection of Kiyomasa with other retainers of Tachibana clan. She lived in the residence of Ichizō(市蔵), the local farmer of Tamana, Higo Province. Kiyomasa wrote in his letter that he sent food provisions to Ginchiyo at that time. Polite words of the letter suggests that he treated Ginchiyo as a noble woman. 

Tachibana Ginchiyo died of illness on November 30, 1602, only 34 years old. She was buried in Ryōsei Temple in Yanagawa. Her death marked the end of the bloodline of her father, Tachibana Dōsetsu.  Ginchiyo’s mother, Nishihime (Hōjuin) resided in the Ichizō home with Ginchiyo. After Ginchiyo’s death, a discussion ensued among relatives whereby Nishihime was then taken to be cared for in a home in Tanba and, in 1616, she died in Higo Province.  On the day of mourning for Ginchiyo, invitees including members of the Monjūsho, the Netabi, and the Yasutake (the first family where she went for marriage), the Kido (the go-between for Dōsetsu), the Kongōin (the family for faith in Inari (god of harvest)), the Uda (descendants of the Ichizō in the village of Haraka where Ginchiyo resided and caretakers of her grave).
.

In popular culture

See also 
 List of female castellans in Japan
Onna-musha

References 

People of Sengoku-period Japan
Women of medieval Japan
1569 births
1602 deaths
Samurai
Ginchiyo
Japanese women in warfare
16th-century Japanese people
Women in 16th-century warfare
16th-century Japanese women
17th-century Japanese women
16th-century women rulers
Women in 17th-century warfare
Deified Japanese people
Japanese Buddhist nuns
16th-century Buddhist nuns
17th-century Buddhist nuns
People from Fukuoka Prefecture